Polymitia is a genus of moths in the family Gracillariidae.

Species
Polymitia eximipalpella (Gerasimov, 1930)
Polymitia laristana Triberti, 1986

External links
Global Taxonomic Database of Gracillariidae (Lepidoptera)

Gracillariinae
Gracillarioidea genera